The LFG Roland D.XV was a World War I German single seat fighter aircraft, ordered as a test-bed for engine comparisons. It was distinguished from earlier Roland biplane designs by the elimination of flying wires.  Two later aircraft, also called LFG Roland D.XV, were completely different designs with slab sided fuselages.

Design and development

The first D.XV version

The D.XV was the last LFG design to use the Klinkerrumpfe (clinker built fuselage) structure, which produced a round cross section fuselage with thin, overlapping, longitudinal spruce strips supported by  a light wooden frame, used on a succession of fighter types beginning with the D.IV. Its wings had constant chord and blunt tips, mounted with more stagger than on their earlier designs.  The D.XV was a cantilevered single bay biplane with a lower wing of shorter span than the upper, so the interplane struts leaned outwards. There were no bracing wires. The second prototype differed in having a broader chord, slightly greater span  upper wing and narrower chord lower planes. The larger upper wing had a trailing edge cut-out to enhance vision from the cockpit, a feature absent from the first aircraft. A single I interplane strut on each side, broadly faired to the wings at top and bottom, replaced the earlier pairs.  Only the upper wings carried ailerons. Both had a flush mounted radiator similar to those used in the Albatros D.V fighters mounted within the upper wing ahead of the pilot.

Initially both prototypes of the D.XV were powered by  Mercedes D.IIIa  six cylinder in-line engines, mounted with the tops of the cylinders just exposed.  This unit was later exchanged on the second prototype for a  BMW IIIa on the same type, mounted within a more circular cross section, slender nose but with more of the cylinders visible.  At the rear the tailplane was mounted at mid-fuselage.  The vertical tail was ovoid, with a broad, balanced rudder that extended down to a sizeable ventral fin which also carried a tailskid.  The main fixed, conventional undercarriage had wheels on a single axle, mounted to the fuselage by V-struts.

The first prototype flew before the end of April 1918 but came back to the factory for modifications the following month.  The second flew that June.  In September the Idflieg, who had originally requested three D.XVs, called for further alterations in response to their flight testing.  The company responded with two examples of a completely different design, which retained the D.XV designation.

The redesigned D.XV

The third prototype of the D.XV had a completely different fuselage and empennage which dispensed with the molded wooden shell of previous Roland aircraft and used a more conventional fabric over frame construction typical of the period, although it tapered to a horizontal knife edge that doubled as the hinge for the single-piece overhung elevator. It was an unequal span, single bay biplane, with constant chord unswept wings separated by N-form interplane struts. The wing cellule was also redesigned compared to the earlier D.XVs. A radiator extended out from the leading edge of the top wing. The cabane structure was built up of four tubular steel vees which angled out from the fuselage to connect both upper and lower longerons to the upper wing spars. Overhung ailerons were used on the upper wing only.  The fin carried a rounded, balanced rudder smoothly profiled with it, which bottomed well above the elevator. The undercarriage was similar to that of the first D.XVs.

The third D.XV first flew in late October 1918 powered by a  BMW IIIa and the similarly designed fourth flew slightly later with a  version of that engine. Apart from the engines the two aircraft differed only in the shape of the sheetmetal around the cowling.

The development of these aircraft ended with the Armistice in November 1918.

Specifications (first prototype)

Notes

References

Bibliography

Biplanes
1910s German fighter aircraft
LFG Roland D.XV
Aircraft first flown in 1918